The Ishkoman valley lies in the north of Ghizer District in Gilgit-Baltistan, Pakistan, bordering Afghanistan and the Pamir Wakhan Corridor. Its altitude ranges from 7,000 to 12,000 feet (2,100 to 3,700 m) above sea level.

See also 
 Pakkora

References 

Ghizer District
Valleys of Gilgit-Baltistan
Regions of Pakistan